Patrick Sheehan (born August 9, 1969) is an American professional golfer who has played on the PGA Tour.

Sheehan was born in Providence, Rhode Island. While at the University of Hartford he was teammates with other future PGA Tour golfers Tim Petrovic and Jerry Kelly. He turned professional in 1992 and though he has never won a PGA Tour event, he has finished second on one occasion and third on another.

Sheehan has two wins on the Nationwide Tour, most recently a playoff victory at the 2009 Athens Regional Foundation Classic over Michael Sim.

Professional wins (2)

Nationwide Tour wins (2)

Nationwide Tour playoff record (1–0)

Results in major championships

"T" = tied
''Note: Sheehan never played in the Masters Tournament or The Open Championship.

See also
2002 Buy.com Tour graduates
2011 PGA Tour Qualifying School graduates

External links

American male golfers
Hartford Hawks men's golfers
PGA Tour golfers
Korn Ferry Tour graduates
Golfers from Rhode Island
Golfers from Florida
Sportspeople from Providence, Rhode Island
People from Oviedo, Florida
1969 births
Living people